J. Hervé Proulx (October 19, 1899 – April 7, 1960) was a merchant and political figure in New Brunswick, Canada. He represented Madawaska County in the Legislative Assembly of New Brunswick from 1944 to 1948 as a Liberal member.

He was born in Rivière-du-Loup, Quebec, the son of J. David Proulx, and was educated there and at Sainte-Anne-de-la-Pocatière and Sainte-Anne-de-Beaupré. In 1922, he married Marie-Anna Malenfant. In the same year, he moved to Edmundston, New Brunswick where he worked as a baker and a grocer. From 1936 to 1946, he was mayor of Edmundston.

References 
J. Hervé Proulx, Archives of the Religious Hospitallers of Saint Joseph

1899 births
1964 deaths
New Brunswick Liberal Association MLAs
Mayors of Edmundston
People from Rivière-du-Loup